The King of the Fall Tour was the third concert tour by Canadian singer the Weeknd, in support of his debut studio album Kiss Land (2013). The tour began on September 19, 2014, in Brooklyn at the Barclays Center and concluded on October 11, 2014, in San Francisco at the Bill Graham Civic Auditorium.

Set list 
This set list is representative of the show on September 14, 2014, at the Barclays Center in Brooklyn. It is not representative of all concerts for the duration of the tour.
 "Enemy"
 "What You Need"
 "'Professional"
 "Adaptation"
 "Love in the Sky"
 "Gone"
 "Crew Love"
 "The Birds Part 1"
 "Belong to the World"
 "Wanderlust"
 "King of the Fall"
 "Drunk in Love"
 "The Morning"
 "Remember You"
 "The Zone"
 "High for This"
 "The Party & the After Party"
 "Loft Music"
 "The Knowing"
 "Twenty Eight"
 "House of Balloons/Glass Table Girls"
 "Wicked Games"
Encore
 "Or Nah"
 "Often"

Tour dates

References

2014 concert tours
The Weeknd concert tours